Gaius Horatius Pulvillus (died  453 BC) was a Roman politician during the 5th century BC, and was consul in 477 and 457 BC.

Family
Ancient sources disagree on his praenomen. Livy and Diodorus Siculus give Gaius for the year 477 BC, but Marcus for 457 BC; however the Fasti Capitolini and Dionysius of Halicarnassus give Gaius for both years. He was the son of Marcus Horatius Pulvillus, consul in 509 and 507 BC, and the grandson of a Marcus Horatius. His complete name is Gaius (or Marcus) Horatius M.f. M.n. Pulvillus.

Biography

First consulship
In 477 BC, was elected consul with Titus Menenius Lanatus. The senate conferred to him management of the war against the Volsci while his colleague prepared to confront the Veientes. However, following the victories of Veii at the Battle of the Cremera and again against Menenius, Horatius was recalled to Rome, where the Veientes had occupied the Janiculum. He won a battle in Janiculum, but the success was insufficient in driving the Etruscans out - the war had to be continued by the consuls of the following year.

Second consulship
In 457 BC, he was consul for the second time with Quintus Minucius Esquilinus The tribunes of the plebs prevented the mobilization of the army for the campaign against the Aequi, but finally gave in when the Sabines were found pillaging Roman fields. Horatius led Roman forces against the Aequi, while Minucius led forces against the Sabines. The number of tribunes was increased to ten this year, with one tradition giving Horatius a leading role in accomplishing this.

End of career
He later entered the college of the augurs. He died in 453 BC during a plague, or typhus which also took the consul Sextus Quinctilius Varus and the consul suffect Spurius Furius Medullinus Fusus who replaced him. Gaius Veturius Cicurinus succeeded Pulvillus within the college of augurs.

References

Modern sources

Ancient sources

Notes

Bibliography

Ancient authors
Dionysius of Halicarnassus in Romaike Archaiologia books 9 and 10.
Diodorus Siculus in Bibliotheca historica book 11. 
 Titus Livius in Roman History book 3.

Modern authors
 
 

453 BC deaths
5th-century BC Roman consuls
Augurs of the Roman Republic
Pulvillus, Gaius
Year of birth unknown

Year of death uncertain